Kocaeli B.B. Ice Arena, formerly Kocaeli Ice Rink, is an indoor ice skating and ice hockey arena located at Şirintepe neighborhood of Izmit in Kocaeli Province, Turkey. It was opened in 1999 and has a seating capacity of 3,600 spectators.

The arena is home to Kocaeli B.B. Kağıt Ice Hockey Men's team, which plays in the Turkish Ice Hockey Super League. Turkish Ice Hockey Women's League matches are also played in the arena, which hosts the women's ice hockey team of the same club.

International events hosted
 1st Balkan (U-16) Ice Hockey Festival - August 29-September 3, 2012
 2013 IIHF World U18 Championships Division III-Group B - February  7–10, 2013
 2013 IIHF World Championship Division II-Group B - April 21–27, 2013

See also
 Turkish Ice Hockey Super League
 Turkish Ice Hockey Federation

References

Indoor arenas in Turkey
Ice hockey venues in Turkey
Buildings and structures in İzmit
Sports venues completed in 1999
1999 establishments in Turkey